Ireneo Legaspi was a Filipino professional golfer who regularly campaigned in the Asia Golf Circuit from the mid-1960s to the mid-1970s.

Known to close friends and family as "Boyong", Legaspi played the tour with many other notable Filipino golfers of that period such as Ben Arda. The highlight of his career was winning the Malaysian Open in 1967.

He also won several tournaments in the Philippine golf circuit as well which regularly placed him at the top ten Filipino golfers list at his peak in the 1970s.

Health problems took him out of the active professional circuit.  He spent his later years teaching the game to numerous students, including free, private lessons to several children in his hometown of Pasig. He continued as a teaching professional until his death in 2006.

Professional wins

Far East Circuit (1)
1967 Malaysian Open

Team appearances
Professional
World Cup (representing the Philippines): 1968, 1972, 1973, 1974, 1980

References

Filipino male golfers
People from Pasig
Sportspeople from Metro Manila
2006 deaths
Year of birth missing